Giovani e belli is a 1996 Italian comedy film directed by Dino Risi at his last film. It is loosely based on Poveri ma belli, directed by the same Risi in 1957.

Plot 
Gino and Luke are two Roman boys: one's rich, the other is a proletarian. Both the two are in love for a gypsy named Zorilla. But the two young men have to deal with the leader of the band of gypsies where lives Zorilla, who is not willing to entrust the girl with two young men. When Zorilla gets the consent of the boss, she goes to live with Luke and Gino, creating havoc in their families.

Cast 
 Anna Falchi: Zorilla
 Luca Venantini: Gino
 Edoardo Scatà: Luca
 Ciccio Ingrassia: King of the Gipsies
 Carlo Croccolo: Bonafoni
 Venantino Venantini: Buby
 Carla Cassola: Mother of Luca
 Gina Rovere: "Astoria" owner

References

External links

1996 films
Films directed by Dino Risi
Films scored by Armando Trovajoli
Italian comedy films
Remakes of Italian films
1996 comedy films
Fictional representations of Romani people
1990s Italian films